The 1968 Dwars door België was the 24th edition of the Dwars door Vlaanderen cycle race and was held on 24 March 1968. The race started and finished in Waregem. The race was won by Walter Godefroot.

General classification

References

1968
1968 in road cycling
1968 in Belgian sport